Carlos Sainz Vázquez de Castro (born 1 September 1994), otherwise known as Carlos Sainz Jr. or simply Carlos Sainz, is a Spanish racing driver currently competing in Formula One for Scuderia Ferrari. He is the son of Carlos Sainz Sr., a double World Rally Champion. 

In 2012, Sainz raced in the British and European Formula 3 championships for Carlin. He raced for DAMS in the 2014 Formula Renault 3.5 season, winning the championship before moving to F1 with Toro Rosso. Sainz moved to McLaren for the 2019 season, while at the same time ending his contract with Red Bull Racing. At the  Sainz took his maiden Formula One podium finish with third. Sainz moved to Ferrari at the end of the 2020 season. At the 2022 British Grand Prix, Sainz took his maiden Formula One pole position and career win.

Early career

Karting
Born in Madrid, Sainz began his career in karting. In 2008 he won the Asia-Pacific KF3 title, as well as finishing runner-up in the Spanish Championship. In 2009 he won the prestigious Junior Monaco Kart Cup, and was runner-up in the European KF3 Championship.

Formula BMW

Sainz raced in Formula BMW Europe in 2010 with the EuroInternational team. He was also part of the Red Bull Junior Team programme. He made his Formula BMW debut during a guest drive in the Formula BMW Pacific series at Sepang. Because he was a guest driver, he was ineligible to score points. However, he placed second in the opening race in Malaysia. That debut was followed by a 4th place. On the following race day, he retired from the first race but won the second race. It was this start that got him a place at the Red Bull Junior Team. Helmut Marko applauded Sainz and his strong start in motor racing. He finished 7th in the following race but again exceeded expectations by winning again. He missed the next races in China but returned in  Singapore. He finished 6th in the first race and 2nd in the second race. He missed the Japanese races but returned to win the season finale in Macau. Overall, in 9 races he achieved 3 pole positions, 2 wins, and 2 fastest laps.

In Formula BMW Europe, he started his career with a podium position of 3rd and 6th place at the Circuit de Catalunya. At Zandvoort, he took 5th and 2nd place. At Valencia, he scored 7th and 10th place. A weekend at Silverstone saw him take 3rd place and a victory in the following race, his first that season. Hockenheim saw him take 11th and 6th place. A 4th and a podium position of 3rd enlightened his championship hopes but Robin Frijns was on a charge, scoring a podium position in every race but 3, two he finished in 4th. A double retirement at Spa put him out of championship contention. An 8th and 6th at the season finale at Monza followed. He finished the season 4th with 227 points.

Sainz also competed in the UK Formula Renault Winter Cup, finishing 6th in the first race and retiring from the second race at Snetterton.

Formula Three

During the 2012 season, Sainz raced in both British and Euro Series Formula 3 championships. Racing for Carlin, he won four races, finished nine times on the podium, as well as scoring a pole position in the British championship, finishing sixth overall in the final championship standings. He scored two podiums and two pole positions in the Euro Series championship, finishing in ninth position overall.

GP3

In 2013, Sainz signed with Arden to compete in the GP3 series. Most Red Bull Racing Juniors race for Arden as it is co-owned by Red Bull boss Christian Horner and driver Mark Webber. His first race weekend in the series did not go as expected. During the first qualifying session of the year, he managed to qualify in 5th place and was only 5 tenths off pole sitter Kevin Korjus. However, he, as well as Alex Fontana and Patrick Kujala, were penalised 10 places for ignoring yellow flags during free practice. During the beginning of race one, Sainz managed to get up to 13th place by passing Alex Fontana and Jimmy Eriksson off the start. By the start of lap 3, he was already 13 seconds behind the leader, however, this was due to him being stuck in traffic. Sainz had made it up to 8th place with his teammate Daniil Kvyat until both cars lacked grip. Because they were both pushing to get into the top ten for points, neither driver decided to manage their Pirelli tryes and so by the end of the race, Kvyat was 20th and Sainz managed to get 15th place and so effectively he never gained or lost any positions. However, worryingly for him, he finished 51 seconds off first placed man Tio Ellinas. Sainz started in 15th place for race 2 on Sunday morning. At the end of lap 1, he managed to gain 6 places to find himself in 9th place. As they approached lap 2, the safety car was deployed due to an accident behind, giving Sainz time to save his tyres. With 5 laps remaining, Sainz was up to 8th place. During the next lap, he managed to put a move on Jack Harvey's ART car to move up into 7th place. Sainz eventually would finish in 7th place. However, post race investigating revealed the Sainz's car was underweight, and so he was disqualified from the final results from race 2, thus scoring no points during what was a difficult weekend for not only Sainz but for his teammate, Kvyat, who retired during the race due to contact with another driver.

In Valencia, Sainz began, and finished, the race in 8th place. In race 2, he started in 4th place and managed to get up into 3rd place by the end of lap 1. He remained in that position, scoring a podium for the first time in GP3. Before the weekend, Sainz had not tallied any championship points. By the time the weekend was over, Sainz had managed to obtain 24 world championship points, 4 for fastest laps in both races. He was now in 6th place in the championship and was looking healthy in the title fight.

It was another bad weekend for Sainz at Silverstone, as in both races he got poor results. During the first race, Sainz was squeezed off track, falling to 9th place. By mid distance, it was all looking good and it looked even better when he managed to overtake Lewis Williamson to get into 8th place. Williamson then moved alongside Sainz to try and overtake but Sainz kept moving over towards him until there was contact. Williamson was sent into a spin whilst Sainz continued to circulate round the track. Due to the damage to his car, Sainz fell down the order until he crossed the finish line in 13th place. In race 2, he finished where he started, in 13th place.

Formula Renault 3.5 

Sainz raced in Formula Renault 3.5 for the first time in 2013. However, because he was more focused on GP3 at the time he missed several races in his first season. In Monaco he was 6th was after a difficult start to his GP3 season. He had a double retirement in Spa. He missed the Moscow and Austria races but returned to Hungary to take 7th place in Race 1 but 22nd in race 2 after a few problems. In France, at the Circuit de Paul Ricard, he had another double retirement. In the last race weekend of the year in Catulunya, he retired in race 1 but managed to score 6th place.

In 2014, he switched teams to DAMS. In the season opener at Monza, he finished 18th in the first race but won the second. He left Monza with 25 points, beating his previous seasons' score by 3 points. Another win at Aragon meant he doubled his score and in race 2, he finished in 4th. Another 4th place followed at the one race in Monaco. The weekend at Spa followed with another 2 wins. Moscow followed and he did not perform well. 14th and 6th meant that he only took 8 points from a possible 50. At the Nürburgring GP Circuit, he won race 1 but in race 2, he retired. In Hungary, he was no match for Roberto Merhi who led by half a minute from the rest of the field in the wet. Another 6th place followed in race 2. In France, he won and scored a total of 50 points to extend his championship lead over Merhi.

Formula One 

Sainz became part of the Red Bull Junior Team in 2010. His first experience in a Formula One car came at the young drivers' test at Silverstone Circuit in July 2013, where he drove both the Toro Rosso STR8 and the Red Bull RB9. Sainz confirmed that discussions had taken place with the struggling Caterham team for a race debut during the  season but ultimately no agreement was reached. As a reward for his Formula Renault 3.5 Series title, Sainz drove the Red Bull RB10 in the post-season test after the 2014 Abu Dhabi Grand Prix.

Toro Rosso (2015–2017)

2015 season - Debut season 

Sainz drove for Scuderia Toro Rosso in the  season where he partnered Max Verstappen, following Daniil Kvyat's promotion to Red Bull. Sainz selected 55 as his race number. He recovered to tenth place in the race.

A 150 km/h and 46 g impact into the barriers during practice for the  resulted in Sainz spending the night in hospital. He missed qualifying but was declared fit to race, however he failed to finish after a brake failure. Sainz finished his debut season fifteenth in the Drivers' Championship, scoring 18 of Toro Rosso's 67 points.

2016 season 

Toro Rosso retained Sainz and Verstappen for the  championship. Sainz qualified seventh and finished ninth at the season-opening , but retired from the  due to a collision with Sergio Pérez.

He retired from the season-ending  due to a collision with Jolyon Palmer. Sainz ended the season twelfth in the Drivers' Championship, scoring 46 of Toro Rosso's 63 points.

2017 season 

Sainz and Kvyat remained with Toro Rosso for the  season. Both drivers blamed each other for the incident, but Sainz was handed a grid penalty for the next race.

Sainz retired from the Austrian Grand Prix with an engine problem and was eliminated on the first lap of the  after a collision with Kvyat. Prior to the  it was announced that Sainz would join Renault for 2018, on loan from Red Bull. He finished the race in a career-best fourth place, in what he described as his "best day in Formula One". He was joined at Toro Rosso by Pierre Gasly for the  after Kvyat was dropped by the team. Sainz retired from the race due to an engine problem. At this stage of the season, Sainz had scored 48 of Toro Rosso's 52 points.

Renault (2017–2018)

2017 season 

Sainz's move to Renault was brought forward and he replaced Jolyon Palmer and partnered Nico Hülkenberg at the team for the final four races of 2017, beginning with the  where he started and finished seventh. Sainz made his way from eighth to fifth place on the first lap of the  but then spun and had to pit for new tyres. He later retired from the race with steering problems. He failed to finish the season-ending  after he was released from a pit stop with a loose wheel. Sainz ended the 2017 season ninth in the Drivers' Championship, scoring 54 points.

2018 season 

These results included the  where he took advantage of a collision between Red Bull teammates Max Verstappen and Daniel Ricciardo to finish a season-high position of fifth. Sainz described his  as a "disaster" and criticised the team's tyre strategy having started eighth and finished tenth. He had ran in sixth place for much of the  but dropped to eighth place at the finish after his MGU-K failed.

Damage received from contact with Sergey Sirotkin on the first lap of the  resulted in a seventeenth-place finish. Sainz finished the season tenth in the Drivers' Championship, three places behind teammate Hülkenberg, scoring 53 of Renault's 122 points. Sainz scored points in thirteen out of the nineteen races he finished. Despite this success, he was replaced by Daniel Ricciardo at Renault for the following season, with the team opting to keep Hülkenberg on instead of Sainz.

McLaren (2019–2020)

2019 season 

Sainz moved to McLaren for the  season, ending his association with Red Bull. He replaced Fernando Alonso and partnered rookie Lando Norris. Sainz consistently scored points thereafter, often finishing as the highest-placed driver behind the top three teams of Mercedes, Ferrari and Red Bull. He scored points at eight of the next nine races; notable results were finishing eighth at the  having started nineteenth, and fifth place at the  despite an incident where he spun and stopped on a wet section of the track.

At the subsequent , he was forced to retire when a wheel was fitted incorrectly during a pit stop. He had made his way to fifth place by the penultimate lap, which became fourth place when Alex Albon was spun around by Lewis Hamilton ahead. Sainz was later elevated to third place after Hamilton received a penalty, earning him his first podium in Formula One. At the season-ending , Sainz passed Hülkenberg on the final lap to take tenth place, scoring one point and earning sixth place in the drivers' championship, one point ahead of Pierre Gasly and four ahead of Albon, both of whom spent part of the season in the superior Red Bull. Sainz scored 96 of McLaren's 145 points over the season.

2020 season 

A slow pit stop contributed to him dropping to ninth place by the finish, however Sainz achieved his first fastest lap in Formula One and in doing so set a new Red Bull Ring track record. Sainz was in fourth place with two laps of the  remaining but suffered a tyre puncture and was ultimately classified thirteenth. He started the 70th Anniversary Grand Prix outside the top ten, but had progressed to fourth place when he entered the pits. A slow pit stop then dropped him back and he went on to finish thirteenth.

He lost places during the pit stops and was in sixth place when the race was red-flagged for Charles Leclerc's accident. He passed three cars and benefited from Lewis Hamilton's penalty to move up to second place behind Pierre Gasly with twenty laps remaining. He ultimately finished 0.4 seconds behind Gasly to take his second podium and what was at the time his career best race finish. Seven consecutive points finishes then followed. He finished sixth at the  having briefly led the race after gaining six positions in the first two laps. A brake failure in qualifying at the  caused him to qualify fifteenth, but he progressed to fifth place by the end of the race.

Sainz finished the 2020 season sixth in the Drivers' Championship for the second consecutive year. He accumulated 105 of McLaren's 202 points and claimed six top-five finishes which, at the time, were both career highs.

Ferrari (2021–present)

2021 season 

Sainz joined Scuderia Ferrari on a two-year contract from the  season partnering Charles Leclerc and replacing Sebastian Vettel. He qualified and finished in eighth place at the Bahrain Grand Prix, his first race for the team. He started eleventh at the Emilia Romagna Grand Prix but progressed to fifth place by the end of the race. He failed to score points at the  despite starting fifth, stating "we got it wrong with strategy". A collision with George Russell on the first lap of sprint qualifying at the  dropped Sainz to the back of the field, but he recovered places in sprint qualifying and in the race to finish sixth.

He finished fourth on track, but claimed his fourth career podium finish after Sebastian Vettel's disqualification. Sainz went on to finish the race third. He recovered to eighth place at the  having started from the back of the grid due to engine component penalties.

Sainz ended the season fifth in the Drivers' Championship with 164.5 points, two positions and 5.5 points ahead of teammate Leclerc. His ability to adapt quickly to Ferrari and his performances relative to Leclerc were widely praised.

2022 season - Maiden win and pole position 

Sainz continued at Ferrari alongside Leclerc for 2022. He qualified third for the season-opening Bahrain Grand Prix. He ran in third place until Max Verstappen's retirement, allowing him into second place behind Leclerc to claim a Ferrari 1–2 finish and an early lead in the Constructors' Championship. A mistake and then a red flag in qualifying at the  meant he started in ninth place. He dropped places at the start and then spun into the gravel, ending his race on lap two.

He was overtaken in the race by Verstappen, but regained the lead when Verstappen slowed with damage. He pitted for soft tyres in the closing laps and passed Leclerc to claim his maiden win in Formula One. Sainz was running third at the  when an engine failure ended his race. He started at the back of the grid at the  after taking new engine components and finished fifth despite a time penalty for an unsafe pit release.

Sainz finished fifth at the  but was demoted to eighth by a penalty for an unsafe pit release. At the rain-affected , he crashed out from third place on the opening lap.

Sainz is set to race for Ferrari until the end of 2024 after signing a contract extension.

Karting record

Karting career summary

Personal life 
Carlos Sainz Jr's mother is Reyes Vázquez de Castro/Monic Sainz and his father is Carlos Sainz Sr. His father had become famous through winning many races and winning the World Rally Championship twice. Eventually as Sainz Jr. got older his father mentored him throughout his journey to get in to F1 racing.

Carlos Sainz Jr. is currently dating a fellow Spaniard, Isabel Hernáez. Isabel Hernáez, 27, is of Madrid descent and completed her bachelor’s degree in Bilingual Journalism. She is currently employed in the fashion sector as a publicity representative.

Racing record

Racing career summary 

† As Sainz was a guest driver, he was ineligible for points.
 Season still in progress.

Complete Formula 3 Euro Series
(key) (Races in bold indicate pole position; races in italics indicate fastest lap)

† Driver did not finish the race but was classified as he completed over 90% of the race distance.

Complete GP3 Series results
(key) (Races in bold indicate pole position; races in italics indicate fastest lap)

Complete Formula Renault 3.5 Series results
(key) (Races in bold indicate pole position; races in italics indicate fastest lap)

 Did not finish, but was classified as he had completed more than 90% of the race distance.

Complete Formula One results
(key) (Races in bold indicate pole position; races in italics indicates fastest lap)

 Did not finish, but was classified as he had completed more than 90% of the race distance.
 Half points awarded as less than 75% of race distance was completed.
 Season still in progress.

Notes

References

External links

  
 
 
 

1994 births
Living people
Sportspeople from Madrid
Spanish racing drivers
Karting World Championship drivers
Formula BMW Pacific drivers
Formula BMW Europe drivers
British Formula Renault 2.0 drivers
Formula Renault Eurocup drivers
Euroformula Open Championship drivers
Formula Renault 2.0 NEC drivers
British Formula Three Championship drivers
Formula 3 Euro Series drivers
FIA Formula 3 European Championship drivers
Spanish GP3 Series drivers
World Series Formula V8 3.5 drivers
Spanish Formula One drivers
Toro Rosso Formula One drivers
Renault Formula One drivers
McLaren Formula One drivers
Ferrari Formula One drivers
EuroInternational drivers
Epsilon Euskadi drivers
Tech 1 Racing drivers
De Villota Motorsport drivers
Koiranen GP drivers
Signature Team drivers
Carlin racing drivers
Arden International drivers
Zeta Corse drivers
DAMS drivers
Formula One race winners